The 1949 Giro d'Italia was the 32nd edition of the Giro d'Italia, one of cycling's Grand Tours. The field consisted of 102 riders, and 65 riders finished the race.

By rider

By nationality

References

1949 Giro d'Italia
1949